Manju Rani (born 26 October 1999) is an Indian boxer. She won a silver medal at the 2019 AIBA Women's World Boxing Championships. She also won a silver medal at the Strandja Memorial Boxing Tournament 2019 held in Bulgaria and bronze medals at the Thailand Open 2017 and India Open 2017.

Background
Rani hails from Rithal Phogat village in the Rohtak district of Haryana. Her father was a Border Security Force officer who died of cancer in 2010. The Rani had initially started playing kabaddi, but her coach advised her to switch to boxing. Inspired by Indian boxer MC Mary Kom's bronze-winning performance at the 2012 London Summer Olympics, Rani made a shift to boxing.

Sports  
Rani won a silver medal at the Strandja Memorial Boxing Tournament 2019, Bulgaria in 48 kg category after losing finals against Josie Gabuco of Philippines. She also won a silver medal at the 2019 AIBA Women's World Boxing Championships after losing Light flyweight final to Russia's Ekaterina Paltceva.

In 2019 Rani signed up with sports management firm Infinity Optimal Solutions (IOS) which will handle her endorsements and commercial interests. In November 2020, Rani served a notice of termination of contract on IOS Sports and Entertainment for not fulfilling the sponsorship deal.

References

1999 births
Living people
AIBA Women's World Boxing Championships medalists
Indian women boxers
Light-flyweight boxers
People from Rohtak district
21st-century Indian women